Jake Robertson (born 14 November 1989) is a New Zealand distance runner. When he was 17 he moved to Iten, Kenya with his twin brother and fellow professional runner Zane Robertson.

He competed in the 5000m at the 2013 World Championships in Moscow, where he finished 14th in the second heat in a time of 14:09.55 and did not qualify for the final. At the 2014 Commonwealth Games in Glasgow he finished ninth in the 5000 metres and seventh in the 10,000 metres.

Robertson was runner up in the 2017 Great North Run in 1:00:12, 6 seconds behind Mo Farah.

In 2018 he took first place at the Houston Half Marathon with a time of 1:00:01. On 4 March 2018 Robertson came third in the Lake Biwa Marathon, in a time of 2:08:26, breaking Rod Dixon's New Zealand record by 33 seconds. Four weeks later, Roberson defended his Crescent City Classic 10 km title in 27:28, equalling his brother Zane's national record.

Robertson placed fifth in the 10,000m at the 2018 Commonwealth Games in the Gold Coast, breaking his brother Zane's national record with a time of 27:30.90.

Personal Bests

References

1989 births
Living people
New Zealand male middle-distance runners
Commonwealth Games competitors for New Zealand
Athletes (track and field) at the 2014 Commonwealth Games
Athletes (track and field) at the 2018 Commonwealth Games
New Zealand twins